Craig Bartlett (born 9 October 1975) is a New Zealand cricketer. He played in one first-class match for Central Districts in 1996/97.

See also
 List of Central Districts representative cricketers

References

External links
 

1975 births
Living people
New Zealand cricketers
Central Districts cricketers
Cricketers from Nelson, New Zealand